Effie is a feminine given name, the diminutive or pet form of Euphemia. Effie may also refer to:

Places in the United States
 Effie, Louisiana, an unincorporated community
 Effie, Minnesota, a city
 Effie (unorganized territory), Minnesota
 Effie, Mississippi, an unincorporated community
 Effie, West Virginia, an unincorporated community
 Lake Effie, Florida

Other uses
 Effie (film), a biopic about Effie Gray
 Effie: Just Quietly, a 2001 Australian satirical television series